Catopyrops keiria is a species of butterfly belonging to the lycaenid family described by Hamilton Herbert Druce in 1891. It is endemic to the Solomon Islands in the Australasian realm.

References

External links
 

Catopyrops
Butterflies described in 1891